"Taiwan the Formosa" (pe̍h-ōe-jī: Tâi-oân Chhùi-chhiⁿ), also "Taiwan the Green", is a poem written (conceived in 1977; finalized in 1993) by Taiwanese poet and clergyman Tīⁿ Jî-gio̍k (鄭兒玉; John Jyi-giokk Ti'n, Er-Yu Cheng), set to music between 1988 and 1993 by neo-Romantic Taiwanese composer Tyzen Hsiao. An English metrical translation was provided by Boris and Clare Anderson. The text represents an early example of the popular verse that emerged from the Taiwanese literature movement in the 1970s and 1980s. In 1994 Hsiao used this hymn to conclude his 1947 Overture for soprano, choir and orchestra.

"Taiwan the Formosa" has been popular with pro-democracy activists  and has been adopted by the Taiwan independence movement as a proposed national anthem for a future Republic of Taiwan. The first stanza is secular. The second, written by popular demand and published in number 2364 of Taiwan Church News in 1997, has overt Christian references in keeping with the poet's vocation as a minister in the Presbyterian Church in Taiwan. The second verse is intended only for performance in church settings or on similarly appropriate occasions.

Lyrics
The poem was originally written in pe̍h-ōe-jī. It has subsequently been translated into other languages, such as Hakka (by clergyman Hiû San-hiùng 邱善雄).

See also
National Anthem of the Republic of China
Proposed flags of Taiwan
Taiwanese literature movement
Taiwan independence
Taiwanization

References

External links

Sheet music and mp3 audio files
. 
Sing our national anthem—Taiwan the Formosa
Translations of Taiwan the Formosa in several languages

Asian anthems
1993 songs
1993 poems
Christian hymns
Taiwanese songs
Patriotic songs
Songs about Asia
Taiwan independence movement